The province of Ravenna is a province in the Emilia-Romagna region of Italy. Its capital is the city of Ravenna. Its provincial president is Claudio Casadio.

History
Ravenna was first inhabited by Italic tribes from northern regions, and was conquered in 191 BCE by the Roman Republic. A port was constructed near Classe, and the Adriatic fleet was based in Ravenna. In 402 CE, Ravenna became the capital of the Western Roman Empire, which endured until the collapse of the empire and the fall of Rome in 476. Following this, the Barbarian Kings Odoacer and then Theodoric controlled Ravenna until it was conquered by the Byzantine Empire in 540; the Byzantines announced it to be their Exarchate.

It continued to be under Byzantine rule until it was invaded by the Lombards in 751, and it was then annexed by King of the Franks Pippin the Younger. It was placed under papal rule by Pippin the Younger in 756 or 757. Ravenna was subsequently ruled by the Holy See until it was given independence in the 12th century. The papacy gained control again in 1278 and was led by papal vicars until it was invaded by Venice in 1441. The War of the League of Cambrai took place near Ravenna in 1512, in which the papal forces were defeated, but the French forces were almost entirely killed and were driven from Italy. It remained under the rule of the Holy See until it became part of the Kingdom of Italy.

In 1921, uprisings in Ravenna triggered a rapid advance of the Fascist movement in the region. Buildings belonging to the Republicans and socialists were seized or burnt down by Italo Balbo, and on July 29, he and his men moved throughout the provinces of Ravenna and Forli, burning every socialist organisation headquarters in a night of terror which was later called the "column of fire". This was a pivotal moment in the advance of Fascism in northern Italy.

Geography
The province of Ravenna is one of nine provinces in the region of Emilia-Romagna in the northeast of Italy. It is on the east of the region and abuts onto the Adriatic Sea. The Province of Ferrara lies immediately to the north and the Metropolitan City of Bologna is to the west. The Metropolitan City of Florence in the region of Tuscany lies to the southwest, and the Province of Forlì-Cesena to the south. The provincial capital is the city of Ravenna, which is situated a few miles inland and is connected to the Adriatic Sea by the Candiano Canal.

Comuni of the Province

Alfonsine (12,113 inhabitants)
Bagnacavallo (16,737 inhabitants)
Bagnara di Romagna (2,427 inhabitants)
Brisighella (7,426 inhabitants)
Casola Valsenio (2,507 inhabitants)
Castel Bolognese (9,573 inhabitants)
Cervia (28,940 inhabitants)
Conselice (9,878 inhabitants)
Cotignola (7,334 inhabitants)
Faenza (58,549 inhabitants)
Fusignano (8,154 inhabitants)
Lugo (32,403 inhabitants)
Massa Lombarda (10,638 inhabitants)
Ravenna (159,052 inhabitants)
Riolo Terme (5,693 inhabitants)
Russi (12,205 inhabitants)
Sant'Agata sul Santerno (2,873 inhabitants)
Solarolo (4,469 inhabitants)

Transport and infrastructures

Railways

The Province of Ravenna is served by the Bologna-Ancona, Russi-Faenza, Faenza-Florence, Faenza-Lavezzola, and Castel Bolognese-Ravenna railway lines. Services are operated by Trenitalia and its subsidiary Trenitalia TPER

The following railway stations can be found:

Alfonsine
Bagnacavallo
Barbiano di Cotignola
Brisighella
Castel Bolognese-Riolo Terme
Cervia-Milano Marittima
Classe
Cotignola
Faenza
Fognano
Granarolo Faentino
Godo
Lavezzola
Lido di Classe-Lido di Savio
Lugo
Massalombarda
Mezzano
Ravenna
Russi
San Cassiano
San Martino in Gattara
San Patrizio
Sant'Agata sul Santerno
Solarolo
Strada Casale
Voltana

Bus services

The main bus operators in the province are START Romagna and CO.ER.BUS, and they operate the main urban, suburban and interurban services in the area and neighbouring provinces

TPER also operate a few bus services between Lugo, Sant'Agata sul Santerno, Massa Lombarda, Bologna and Imola, with other services bound for the Province of Ferrara. However, its route 296 (Lugo–Bagnacavallo–Ravenna–Lido Adriano) is the only TPER route entirely in the Province of Ravenna.

Airports 

The Province of Ravenna has no operating international airport, but only a small aerodrome in Ravenna for private flights and flying schools. 

The closest international airports are Bologna Airport and Rimini Airport.

References

External links
Official website  

 
Ravenna